Felis chaus chaus is the nominate subspecies of the jungle cat.

The Baltic-German naturalist Johann Anton Güldenstädt was the first scientist who observed a jungle cat in the southern frontier of the Russian empire during his travels in 1768–1775 undertaken on behalf of Catherine II of Russia. He described the cat in 1776 under the name "chaus".

Taxonomic history 
In 1778, the German naturalist Johann Christian Daniel von Schreber used chaus as the species name and is therefore considered the binomial authority.

In the 19th and 20th centuries, several specimen were described and proposed as subspecies:
In the 1820s, the German explorer Eduard Rüppell collected a female Felis Chaus near Lake Manzala in the Nile Delta. But only in 1832, the German naturalist Johann Friedrich von Brandt recognized the distinctness of the Egyptian jungle cat and proposed the name Felis Rüppelii. In 1898, William Edward de Winton renamed the Egyptian jungle cat as Felis chaus nilotica, as the name Felis ruppelii was already applied to a different cat.
In 1898, the British zoologist William Edward de Winton examined the collection of jungle cat skins in the Natural History Museum and revised taxonomic assessments of the jungle cat group. A single skin collected near Jericho in 1864 prompted him to describe a new subspecies Felis chaus furax as this skin was smaller than other jungle cat skins.
During an expedition to Afghanistan in the 1880s, mammal skins were collected and later presented to the Indian Museum. One cat skin without skull from the area of Maimanah in the country's north was initially identified as of Felis caudata, but in the absence of skins for comparison the author was not sure whether his identification was correct. In his revision of Asiatic wildcat skins collected in the Zoological Museum of Berlin, the German zoologist Zukowsky reassessed the Maimanah cat skin, and because of its larger size and shorter tail than caudata skins proposed a new species with the scientific name Felis (Felis) maimanah. Zukowsky assumed that the cat inhabits the region south of the Amu Darya River. The Russian zoologist Ognev acknowledged Zukowsky’s assessment but also suggested that more material is needed for a definite taxonomic classification of this cat. In his posthumously published monograph about skins and skulls of the genus Felis in the collection of the Natural History Museum, the British taxonomist Pocock referred neither to Zukowsky’s appraisal nor to jungle cat skins from Afghanistan. The British natural historian Ellerman and zoologist Morrison-Scott tentatively subordinated the Maimanah cat skin as a subspecies of Felis chaus.
In 1969, the Russian biologist Heptner described a jungle cat from the lower course of the Vakhsh River in Central Asia and proposed the name Felis (Felis) chaus oxiana.
Since 2017, all four are considered synonyms of F. c. chaus.

The German zoologist Paul Matschie in 1912 and the American zoologist Joel Asaph Allen in 1920 challenged the validity of Güldenstädt's nomenclature, arguing that the name Felis auriculis apice nigro barbatis was not a binomen and therefore improper, and that "chaus" was used as a common name rather than as part of the scientific name.

Distribution
This subspecies occurs in the Caucasus, Turkestan, Iran, Baluchistan and Yarkand, Chinese Turkestan, Palestine, southern Syria, Iraq, Egypt; northern Afghanistan and south of the Amu Darya River; along the right tributaries of the Amu Darya River, in the lower courses of the Vakhsh River ranging eastwards to the Gissar Valley and slightly beyond Dushanbe.

Jungle cats have also been recorded in central and southern Turkey.

References

chaus